Matching Sweaters is the twelfth album by Celtic band Gaelic Storm.  It was released on July 24, 2015.

Track listing 
All arrangements by Gaelic Storm.

 "Another Stupid Drinking Song" (Steve Twigger, Steve Wehmeyer, Patrick Murphy) – 3:22
 "Girls' Night in Galway" (Twigger, Wehmeyer, Murphy) – 3:15
 "Whiskeyed Up and Womaned Out" (Twigger, Wehmeyer, Murphy) – 4:17
 "The Narwhaling Cheesehead" (Tap Room/Traditional - John Nee's/Traditional - Step on it Darsh/Pete Purvis) – 3:25
 "Paddy's Rubber Arm" (Twigger, Wehmeyer, Murphy) – 2:58
 "Six of One" (Twigger, Wehmeyer, Murphy) – 4:08
 "The Rustling Goat Gang" (Twigger, Wehmeyer, Murphy) – 3:53
 "Dancing in the Rain" (Twigger, Wehmeyer, Murphy) – 3:45
 "The Teachers' Snow Day" (Rakes of Kildare/Traditional - Kildare Reel/Purvis - Rombello/Purvis) – 4:19
 "What a Way to Go" (Twigger, Wehmeyer, Murphy) – 3:49
 "Son of a Poacher" (Twigger, Wehmeyer, Murphy) – 3:51
 "If You've Got Time" (Twigger, Wehmeyer, Murphy) – 2:54

Personnel 
Gaelic Storm
 Patrick Murphy
 Steve Twigger
 Ryan Lacey
 Peter Purvis
 Kiana Weber

Charts

References 

Gaelic Storm albums
2015 albums